Hamlet is a 1969 British tragedy period drama film. It is a film adaptation of Shakespeare's play Hamlet, starring Nicol Williamson as Prince Hamlet. It was directed by Tony Richardson and based on his own stage production at the Roundhouse theatre in London. The film also stars Anthony Hopkins as King Claudius, Judy Parfitt as Queen Gertrude, Marianne Faithfull as Ophelia, Mark Dignam as Polonius, Gordon Jackson as Horatio, and Michael Pennington as Laertes.

Cast
Nicol Williamson as Hamlet
Judy Parfitt as Gertrude
Anthony Hopkins as Claudius
Marianne Faithfull as Ophelia
Mark Dignam as Polonius
Michael Pennington as Laertes
Gordon Jackson as Horatio
Ben Aris as Rosencrantz
Clive Graham as Guildenstern
Peter Gale as Osric
Roger Livesey as First Player / Gravedigger
John J. Carney as Player King (as John Carney)
Richard Everett as Player Queen
Robin Chadwick as Francisco
Ian Collier as Priest
Michael Elphick as Captain
David Griffith as Messenger (as Mark Griffith)
Anjelica Huston as Court Lady
Bill Jarvis as Courtier
Roger Lloyd Pack as Reynaldo (as Roger Lloyd-Pack)
John Railton as 1st Sailor
John Trenaman as Barnardo
Jennifer Tudor as Court lady

Production

The film, a departure from big-budget Hollywood renditions of classics, was made with a small budget and a very minimalist set, consisting of Renaissance fixtures and costumes in a dark, shadowed space. A brick tunnel is used for the scenes on the battlements. The Ghost of Hamlet's father is represented only by a light shining on the observers. The film places much emphasis on the sexual aspects of the play, to the point of strongly implying an incestuous relationship between Laertes and Ophelia.  Williamson was only one year younger than Parfitt, who played his mother, and was one year older than Hopkins, who played his uncle.

DVD Release
Hamlet was released to DVD by Sony Pictures Home Entertainment on 3 July 2012 via the Choice Collection DVD-on-demand setup from Amazon.

References

External links
 
 

Films based on Hamlet
1969 films
Films directed by Tony Richardson
Columbia Pictures films
1969 drama films
British drama films
Fratricide in fiction
Filmways films
Poisoning in film
1970s English-language films
1960s English-language films
1960s British films
1970s British films